Tokutarō Watanabe was the owner of the A. Farsari & Co. photographic studio. Watanabe initially was the firm's chief operator under the ownership by Adolfo Farsari and then Tonokura Tsunetarō. Following the departure of Tonokura in 1904, Watanabe became the new owner, only to be succeeded by the firm's former secretary Fukagawa Itomaro. A. Farsari & Co. was based in Yokohama, Japan.

References
Dobson, Sebastian. "Yokohama Shashin". In Art & Artifice: Japanese Photographs of the Meiji Era – Selections from the Jean S. and Frederic A. Sharf Collection at the Museum of Fine Arts, Boston (Boston: MFA Publications, 2004), 28.

19th-century births
20th-century deaths
Year of birth missing
Year of death missing